Charles J. Hunt (April 8, 1881 – February 3, 1976) was an American film editor and director. He also worked at various times as an actor, production manager and associate producer.

Selected filmography
 The Fate of a Flirt (1925)
 The Smoke Eaters (1926)
 The Dixie Flyer (1926)
 The Warning Signal (1926)
 Modern Daughters (1927)
 The Show Girl (1927)
 On the Stroke of Twelve (1927)
 The Midnight Watch (1927)
 South of Panama (1928)
Queen of the Chorus (1928)
 Thundergod (1928)
 Smoke Bellew (1929)
 Rider of the Plains (1931)
 Riders of the North (1931)
 Police Court (1932)
 Trailing the Killer (1932)
 Law of the West (1932)
 The Devil on Horseback (1936)
 We're in the Legion Now! (1936)
 Go-Get-'Em, Haines (1936)
 Captain Calamity (1936)

References

Bibliography
 Munden, Kenneth White. The American Film Institute Catalog of Motion Pictures Produced in the United States, Part 1. University of California Press, 1997.

External links

1881 births
1976 deaths
American film directors
American film editors
American film producers
People from Fort Lee, New Jersey